Sergey Alexeyevich Chaplygin (5 April 1869 – 8 October 1942) was a Russian and Soviet physicist, mathematician, and mechanical engineer. He is known for mathematical formulas such as Chaplygin's equation and for a hypothetical substance in cosmology called Chaplygin gas, named after him.

He graduated in 1890 from Moscow University, and later became a professor. He taught mechanical engineering at Moscow Higher Courses for Women in 1901, and of applied mathematics at Moscow School of Technology, 1903. He was appointed Director of the courses in 1905. Leonid I. Sedov was one of his students.

Chaplygin's theories were greatly inspired by N. Ye. Zhukovsky, who founded the Central Institute of Aerodynamics. His early research consisted of hydromechanics. His "Collected Works" in four volumes were published in 1948.

Honours and awards
 Hero of Socialist Labour (1 February 1941)
 Two Orders of Lenin (1 February 1941 and 22 December 1933)
 Order of the Red Banner of Labour, twice (10 July 1927 and ?)
 Zhukovsky Prize (1925)

Chaplygin was elected to the Russian Academy of Sciences (the Academy of Sciences of the USSR in 1925-1991) in 1924.

The lunar crater Chaplygin and town Chaplygin are named in his honour.

See also
Chaplygin gas
Chaplygin problem
Chaplygin's equation
Lamb–Chaplygin dipole
Chaplygin sleigh
Chaplygin's top

External links

1869 births
1942 deaths
People from Chaplygin
Mathematicians from the Russian Empire
Heroes of Socialist Labour
Recipients of the Order of Lenin
Full Members of the USSR Academy of Sciences
Corresponding Members of the Russian Academy of Sciences (1917–1925)
Moscow State University alumni
Physicists from the Russian Empire
Soviet mathematicians
Soviet physicists
19th-century mathematicians from the Russian Empire
20th-century Russian mathematicians
20th-century Russian physicists
Russian mechanical engineers
Soviet mechanical engineers
Engineers from the Russian Empire
Central Aerohydrodynamic Institute employees